Ganesh Mali (born 14 May 1993) is an Indian weightlifter who won a bronze medal in the men's 56 kg weight class at the 2014 Commonwealth Games at Glasgow. He lives at Kolhapur city in the Maharashtra state of India.

References

External links
List of Medal winners at Commonwealth Games Glasgow 2014

Living people
Indian male weightlifters
Commonwealth Games bronze medallists for India
People from Kolhapur
1993 births
Weightlifters at the 2014 Commonwealth Games
Weightlifters from Maharashtra
Commonwealth Games medallists in weightlifting
21st-century Indian people
Medallists at the 2014 Commonwealth Games